Restronguet is in south Cornwall in the United Kingdom and gives its name to:

 Restronguet Creek, a tidal ria
 Restronguet Passage, a waterside hamlet
 Restronguet Point, a small headland and coastal settlement
 Restronguet Sailing Club, a club at Mylor Churchtown